is a type of music used in kabuki theatre performances in Japan.

Originally derived from the Portuguese word , meaning a stretchy material (and still used today to refer to knitted garments),  came to denote a form of theatrical music which expanded and contracted in order to fit the events unfolding on stage. As a result, they are usually instrumental solos, rather than songs.

References

Japanese styles of music
Kabuki